Marieanne Spacey-Cale (née Spacey),  (born 13 February 1966) is an English former international women's footballer. Having played 91 times for England, Spacey is considered one of the greatest English footballers of all time. She is currently Head of Girls and Women's football at Southampton F.C. and head coach of Southampton FC Women.

Club career
Spacey was prevented from participating in boys' football at school but joined British Oxygen's women's team at the age of 13 in 1979. She played for Friends of Fulham under the tutelage of Fred Brockwell and was reported to have signed for Italian club Roi Lazio as a 19-year–old in 1985. Spacey also played for HJK Helsinki in Finland. The Finnish move came about through Spacey's England teammate Louise Waller, who had played for HJK the previous summer. After playing in Friends of Fulham's 3–2 WFA Cup final defeat to Leasowe Pacific at Old Trafford in April 1989, Spacey flew out to Helsinki with Waller and remained until September. Spacey then returned to England and scored 12 goals in the first five games of the 1991–92 season for her old club, who became known as Wimbledon Ladies in 1991.

Spacey then spent eight seasons with Arsenal from 1993, before moving to Fulham on a professional contract in the 2002 close season. She had missed the second part of 1995–96 due to pregnancy. In her final season with Arsenal she was the leading goalscorer and FA Players' Player of the Year, also winning a Sport Relief special achievement award. Throughout her Arsenal career Spacey had enjoyed great success as a deep–lying forward player, helping The Gunners win numerous trophies.

Vic Akers said of Spacey's career in 2009:

In 2002–03 Spacey won a domestic treble with Fulham.

International career
Spacey made her debut for England against Belgium on 20 August 1984. She played in all four of England's games at their first FIFA Women's World Cup appearance in 1995. Having finished playing for England with a respectable 76 appearances, Spacey was later recalled by Hope Powell to add experience in midfield. Spacey was surprised by the development: "I honestly thought that wouldn't happen again. When I got the letter my legs went weak. I've played 76 times for England and now I feel like the new girl!" She went on to play a total of 91 times for her country, scoring 28 goals before retiring after UEFA Women's Euro 2001, aged 36.

Among Spacey's achievements with England were two Mundialito tournament wins in 1985 and 1988. She scored twice in the 1985 final against hosts Italy as England won 3–2 in Caorle. In May 1990 Spacey scored at Wembley Stadium in an exhibition match played against Scotland. The following April she scored a hat-trick against the same opposition in a 5–0 friendly win at Adams Park in Wycombe. When The Football Association (FA) took over running the national team in 1993, Spacey plundered four goals in the first game that September, a 10–0 win over Slovenia in Ljubljana.

International goals

Coaching career 
Spacey has a UEFA Pro Licence. She became manager of Fulham Ladies when they reverted to semi–pro status in 2003, but left in 2006 after Fulham scrapped their women's team altogether. Later that year she became a senior coach for AFC Wimbledon Ladies. Spacey later coached the England Under-16, Under-17 and Under-19 teams as well as working in the coaching departments of Arsenal and Charlton Athletic.

In November 2006 she was appointed girls and women's football development officer for the Worcestershire FA.

In December 2013, Spacey was appointed assistant to England women's manager Mark Sampson. She was part of Mark Sampson's coaching staff when the Lionesses came third at the FIFA Women's World Cup in Canada in 2015. In 2017, with Spacey as head coach, the England under-23 team won the Nordic tournament in Sweden, beating Norway 2–0 in the final match.

In July 2018, Southampton F.C. announced that Spacey would be joining as the head of girls and women's football technical department, based at the Staplewood Campus full-time and also overseeing the club's Regional Talent Club. The club said her appointment was intended to help their women's team's "future goal" of playing in the FA Women's Championship. Their initial bid, to join the inaugural Championship, was rejected by The FA.

In her first season as head coach of the senior women's team, who play in the FA Women's National League, Premier Division South, the team completed the double, winning the league title (with a perfect 18 wins from 18 games) and League Cup.

Honours 
Spacey was inducted into the English Football Hall of Fame in 2009.

She was appointed Member of the Order of the British Empire (MBE) in the 2016 Birthday Honours for services to football.

References

Bibliography

External links

 
 

1966 births
Living people
English women's footballers
Arsenal W.F.C. players
Fulham L.F.C. players
England women's international footballers
FA Women's National League players
English Football Hall of Fame inductees
1995 FIFA Women's World Cup players
English expatriate women's footballers
English women's football managers
Members of the Order of the British Empire
Helsingin Jalkapalloklubi (women) players
Expatriate women's footballers in Finland
Kansallinen Liiga players
English expatriate sportspeople in Finland
Women's association football midfielders
Women's association football forwards